Terry Cottam is a guitar player, composer, and teacher. He has played with several bands, including The Jess Upton Soul Band, Is, Jumpback, Terra Cotta, Edgar Broughton Band, Dreamcloud, Chameleon, Maya, The Jokers, and 5 Square 4.

Cottam joined the Edgar Broughton Band in 1975. In 1980, he formed The Jump Back Band, a three-piece act.

Personal life
Terry is married to Sue Cottam.  His son Buster is also a performer.

References

English rock guitarists
Living people
Year of birth missing (living people)